Carlos Abellán Ossenbach (born 1 March 1983) is a former Spanish cyclist.

Career
In his second year with the team, he won the Clasica San Rokillo, a one-day race. In 2007 he returned to the amateur ranks, and won the national amateur time trial championships. Abellán then ended his career.

Major results
2005
 1st Clasica San Rokillo
2007
 1st  National Amateur Time trial Championships

References

1983 births
Living people
Spanish male cyclists
Cyclists from Madrid
21st-century Spanish people